The 2013 Egypt Cup tournament came to a close on 9 November 2013 when Zamalek played Wadi Degla at El Gouna Stadium in El Gouna.

it was Zamalek's 35th final, It was Wadi Degla's first final, Zamalek won the game 3–0, claiming the cup for the 22nd time.

Route to the final

Game description

Match details

External links 
 https://int.soccerway.com/matches/2013/11/09/egypt/cup/wady-degla/zamalek/1600803/?ICID=PL_MS_01
 http://www.footballdatabase.eu/football.coupe.zamalek.wadi-degla.156568.en.html

2013
Cup Final
EC 2013
EC 2013
November 2013 sports events in Africa